The November 2022 Great Lakes winter storm was a winter storm that affected parts of Pennsylvania, Ohio, and New York. The highest total snowfall of the storm was 81.2 inches, recorded in Hamburg, New York. At least four fatalities occurred, with three in New York and one in Indiana.

Meteorological history
The storm started on November 16, 2022, at around 18:00 UTC with snowfall being recorded just south of Buffalo, New York. Hamburg recorded  of snow by 8AM EST on November 18. In Buffalo, from 8–9 PM,  fell. Over 6,000 customers lost power.

Snow and ice totals

Preparations

Winter weather advisories were in place for six states: Pennsylvania, New York, Ohio, Michigan, Indiana, and Wisconsin. New York Governor Kathy Hochul declared a state of emergency for 11 counties. The Buffalo Bills–Cleveland Browns game was moved to Detroit. Numerous flights were cancelled at the Buffalo Niagara International Airport. The Buffalo Skyway was closed temporarily. The New York Thruway west of Exit 46, the road closed on November 17 at 4pm EST.  Multiple Amtrak stations such as Buffalo, Niagara Falls and Depew, and Erie County suspended all bus service.

Impact

As of 8:00AM EST on November 18, an estimated 8,000 customers were without power. It has been recorded at the Buffalo Niagara International Airport as the third-snowiest November. At least two deaths occurred, due to cardiac arrest after shoveling the snow. A third person died in Hamlet, Indiana after his snowplow rolled over. Natural Bridge, New York received  of snow. A  stretch of the New York Thruway was closed from Rochester, New York to the Pennsylvania border. A full commercial travel ban was issued for multiple highways in New York. Thundersnow was also recorded when the snowstorm hit, with several cars and trucks stuck in the snow. At  in a single day, Orchard Park set a record for most snow in a single day, with the total snowfall being . In Gile, Wisconsin, as of 8 pm on November 18, recorded  of snow. In addition,  fell in Grand Rapids, Michigan in 65 hours, including daily snowfall records on November 17 and 19.

See also
 Weather of 2022
 2022–23 North American winter
 November 13–21, 2014 North American winter storm
 Late December 2022 North American winter storm

References

2022 meteorology
2022 natural disasters in the United States
2022 in New York (state)
2022 in Ohio
2022 in Pennsylvania
November 2022 events in the United States
2022–23 North American winter